Micah Cory Roper (born July 31, 1977) is an American professional stock car racing driver. He last competed part-time in the NASCAR Camping World Truck Series, driving the No. 04 Ford F-150 for Roper Racing. He is not related to Tony Roper or his father Dean Roper.

Racing career

ASA National Tour
In 2002, Roper attempted to run the race in Illiana Motor Speedway in the No. 87 Pontiac, but failed to qualify.

Camping World Truck Series

Roper made his NASCAR debut in 2018 at Martinsville in the Truck Series. He drove the No. 04 car for his own team, Roper Racing. He finished 13th in his first race after starting 17th. Roper ran his second race at Iowa, starting 26th and finishing 18th.

In Roper's maiden voyage of 2019, he made an impressive run to 2nd position from his 25th starting position at Daytona International Speedway before being eliminated by a wreck. Roper said that his team would like to run the full 2019 schedule but would need more funding to do so. At Atlanta Roper qualified 28th while finishing 16th. At Las Vegas he would have a strong showing qualifying 5th but ending early as he would tangle with Matt Crafton early in the race. Roper had planned a full schedule in 2020. Following the Daytona Road Course event, Roper and his team did not show up for another event.

Roper announced plans to attempt the full schedule again in 2021. In the opener at Daytona, Roper took the lead on the final lap but suffered damage from a push by Sheldon Creed and was unable to block Ben Rhodes, who—along with Jordan Anderson—passed him coming to the finish as he finished third.

On February 22, 2023, Roper was indefinitely suspended by NASCAR for violating NASCAR's substance abuse policy. He will not be eligible to return to the sport until he completes NASCAR's road to recovery program.

Motorsports career results

NASCAR
(key) (Bold – Pole position awarded by qualifying time. Italics – Pole position earned by points standings or practice time. * – Most laps led.)

Camping World Truck Series

 Season still in progress
 Ineligible for series points

References

External links
 

Living people
1977 births
Racing drivers from Texas
NASCAR drivers